Venusberg (German; French Mont de Vénus, "Mountain of Venus") is a motif of European folklore rendered in various legends and epics since the Late Middle Ages.
It is a variant of the folktale topos of "a mortal man seduced by the fairy queen visits the otherworld" (as in Thomas the Rhymer). In German folklore of the 16th century, the narrative becomes associated with the  minnesinger Tannhäuser who becomes obsessed with worshipping the goddess Venus.

Origin
Venusberg as a name of the otherworld or fairyland is first mentioned in German in Formicarius by Johannes Nider (1437/38) in the context of the rising interest in witchcraft at the time.

The earliest version of the narrative of the  legend, a knight seeking forgiveness for having adored a pagan goddess in an enchanted mountain being rejected by the pope and returning to the mountain, even though a miracle prompts the pope to send emissaries after him to call him back, is first recorded  in the form of a ballad by the Provencal writer Antoine de la Sale, part of the compilation known as La Salade (c. 1440). In this version, likely based on an Italian original, the "queen of the fairies" is named Sibylla rather than Venus and there is no association with Tannhäuser.

Tannhauser folk ballad
The narrative of La Sale's ballad becomes conflated with the name of Tannhäuser in German folklore of the early 16th century. A German Tannhauser folk ballad is recorded in numerous versions beginning around 1510, both in High German and Low German variants. Folkloristic versions were still collected from oral tradition in the early-to-mid 20th century, especially in the Alpine region (a Styrian variant with the name Waldhauser was collected in 1924). Early written transmission around the 1520s was by the means of printed single sheets popular at the time, with examples known from Augsburg, Leipzig, Straubing, Vienna, and Wolfenbüttel. The earliest extant version is from Jörg Dürnhofers Liederbuch, printed by Gutknecht of Nuremberg about 1515. This Lied von dem Danheüser explores the life of the legendary knight Tannhauser, who spent a year at the mountain worshiping Venus and returned there after believing that he had been denied forgiveness for his sins by Pope Urban IV. The Nuremberg version also identifies Venusberg with the Hörselberg hill chain near Eisenach in Thuringia, although other versions identify other geographical locations, as for instance in Swabia, near Waldsee.

The popularity of the ballad continues unabated well into the 17th century. Versions are recorded by Heinrich Kornmann (1614) and Johannes Preatorius (1668).

Modern reception
The ballad was then received in German Romanticism. Ludwig Tieck published the tale in his Romantische Dichtungen collection of 1799. The Preatorius version of 1668 was included in Des Knaben Wunderhorn, a compilation of German folk poems published by Achim von Arnim and Clemens Brentano in 1806. A summary was included in the Deutsche Sagen collection by the Brothers Grimm in 1816. Later adaptions include Joseph Freiherr von Eichendorff's novella Das Marmorbild (The Marble Statue, 1818) as well as works by Ludwig Bechstein (1835) and Ludwig Uhland (Volkslieder, 1844). In Heinrich Heine's laconic poem Tannhäuser: A Legend, the hero spent seven years there before departing for Rome.

The motif became most popular as the principal source for Richard Wagner's large three-act opera Tannhäuser (1845), which changes a few story elements and is known for including a scandalous depiction of the revels of Venus's court in its first scene. The English poet Algernon Charles Swinburne tells the story in the first person in his poem Laus Veneris. Anthony Powell called an early novel of his Venusberg. Another visitor was Thomas the Rhymer (Thomas Ercildoune, c. 1220-97). The Tannhauser Gate motif of film (Blade Runner, 1982) and cyberpunk fiction originated as an allusion to the pathway that the knight used to discover and travel to this supposed place of ultimate erotic adventure.

The "Castle Anthrax" episode in Monty Python and the Holy Grail (1975) was based on the Venusberg myth.

References

Sources
A.C. Swinburne, "Laus Veneris" on the Victorian Web.

External links

Analysis of the Venusberg Myth in Collier's artwork

European folklore
Mythological mountains
Venus (mythology)